Allison Otto is an American documentary film director. She is best known for her work on The Thief Collector, The Love Bugs and Keeper of the Mountains.

Career
Allison graduated from Stanford University with a Bachelor's degree in Communications and a Master's degree in Sociology. Her first film, Keeper of the Mountains, premiered in 2013. It was a documentary portrait of Elizabeth Hawley, an American journalist and chronicler of Himalayan mountaineering expeditions. In 2013 the film received a Special Jury Mention at the Banff Mountain Film Festival. It was also named One of the Best Adventure Films of 2013 by Outside (magazine).

In 2019, Allison released The Love Bugs, which she co-directed with Maria Clinton. The film was shortlisted by the International Documentary Association for the 2019 Best Documentary Short award and selected as part of the American Film Showcase (also known as the American Film Program). She was a finalist for a Heartland Emmy Awards for Outstanding Human Interest Special in 2019. She is also the recipient of the SFFILM Catapult Film Fellowship in 2019. She is also slated to direct the upcoming feature documentary The Heist.

Filmography

Awards and nominations

References

External links
 
 

Living people
American documentary film directors
American documentary film producers
Year of birth missing (living people)